The Constituent Assembly of Bangladesh was the constituent assembly of Bangladesh. It was the country's provisional parliament between 1971 and 1973. In 1972, it drafted and adopted the Constitution of Bangladesh. The assembly was dominated by the Awami League, with a minority being independent lawmakers.

Creation
Prior to the 1971 Bangladesh Liberation War, the first general election of Pakistan saw 169 seats in East Pakistan being contested for the National Assembly of Pakistan and 300 seats for the East Pakistan Provincial Assembly. The Awami League party ran on the platform of developing a new Pakistani constitution based on the 1966 Six Points. The Awami League won 167 out of 169 seats in the National Assembly and 288 out of 300 seats in the Provincial Assembly. Despite gaining the right to form a government, it was not allowed to take power by the erstwhile military junta in West Pakistan. The delay in the transfer of power sparked the liberation war.

During the war, elected representatives met in Mujibnagar on 17 April 1971. They signed the Proclamation of Bangladeshi Independence, which was declared as a provisional constitution. The elected representatives were transformed into a constituent assembly. After the war ended, the assembly convened in January 1972.

Members
The initial tally of members was 469. However, the tally dropped to 404 after the war. Ten legislators had died, of whom five were killed by the Pakistan Army. 23 were disqualified or expelled from their party, the Awami League; and two defected to Pakistan.

Shah Abdul Hamid was elected as the assembly's speaker and Mohammad Mohammadullah as deputy speaker.

Rules of Procedure
The Rules of Procedure was adopted in the first two-day plenary session.

Drafting committee
The Constitution Drafting Committee was formed on 11 April 1972. It had 34 members with Kamal Hossain as chairman. Razia Banu was its only female member. Barrister Amirul Islam and Advocate Suranjit Sengupta were among the prominent members on the committee. Sengupta was a vocal member of the opposition bench.

Members of the committee are included below. The abbreviations MNA stands for "Member of the National Assembly" and MPA for "Member of the Provincial Assembly".

 Kamal Hossain (MNA- Dhaka-9)
 Md. Lutfor Rahman (MNA- Rangpur-4)
 Abu Sayeed (MNA- Pabna-5)
 M Abdur Rahim (MPA-Dinajpur-7)
 M Amir-ul Islam (MNA- Kushtia-1)
 Mohammad Nurul Islam Manjur (MNA- Bakerganj-3)
 Abdul Muntakim Chowdhury (MNA- Sylhet-5)
 Khitish Chandra Mondal (MPA-Bakerganj-15)
 Suranjit Sengupta (MNA- Sylhet-2)
 Syed Nazrul Islam (MNA- Mymensingh-17)
 Tajuddin Ahmad (MNA- Dhaka-5)
 Khandakar Mushtaq Ahmed (MNA- Cumilla -8)
 AHM Qamaruzzaman (MNA- Rajshahi-6)
 Abdul Momin Talukdar (MNA- Pabna-5)
 Abdur Rouf (MNA- Rangpur-11)
 Mohammad Baitullah (MNA- Rajshahi -3)
 Barrister Badal Rashid, Bar-at-Law.  P.A Of Tajuddin Ahmad Of Mujib Nagar Sarkar.
 Khandaker Abdul Hafiz (MNA- Jessore 7)
 Shaukat Ali Khan (MNA- Tangail-2)
 Md Humayun Khalid
 Asaduzzaman Khan (MPA- Jessore-10)
 A. K. Mosharraf Hossain Akhand (MNA-Mymensingh-6)
 Abdul Momin
 Shamsuddin Molla (MNA-Faridpur-4)
 Sheikh Abdur Rahman (MNA-Khulna-2)
 Fakir Sahab Uddin Ahmed
 Khurshed Alam (MNA-Cumilla-7)
 Sirajul Haque (MNA-Cumilla-4)
 Dewan Abul Abbas (MNA-Cumilla-5)
 Abdur Rashid (MNA-Noakhali-)
 Hafez Habibur Rahman (MNA-Cumilla-12)
 Nurul Islam Chowdhury (MPA-Chattragram-6)
 Muhammad Khaled (MPA-Chattragram—5)
 Begum Razia Bano (women's seats, National Assembly)

Citizenship debate
The minority Chakma lawmaker Manabendra Narayan Larma protested the use of the term "Bengali" to describe all Bangladeshi citizens. Larma said in his speech that "Under no definition or logic can a Chakma be a Bengali or a Bengali be a Chakma… As citizens of Bangladesh we are all Bangladeshis, but we also have a separate ethnic identity...".

Article 70
Under the interim constitution, law making powers resided with the executive branch. When K. M. Obaidur Rahman, an Awami League lawmaker, raised a question as to why the constituent assembly was not given legislative powers, Prime Minister Sheikh Mujibur Rahman became annoyed. Subsequently, on the advice of the prime minister, President Abu Sayeed Chowdhury introduced the Bangladesh Constituent Assembly (Cessation of Membership) Order 1972. The order stipulated that any resolution by a lawmaker without the approval of his/her party would result in expulsion from the assembly. The order inspired Article 70 of the Constitution of Bangladesh, which bans free votes and crossing the floor.

Enactment
The Assembly approved the constitution on 4 November 1972, and it took effect on 16 December 1972—a day commemorated as Victory day in Bangladesh. Once the constitution took effect, the constituent assembly became the provisional parliament of Bangladesh until the first elections under the new constitution took place in 1973.

Legacy

The constitution founded the unitary parliamentary republic in Bangladesh. It laid down a list of fundamental rights in Bangladesh. The original 1972 constitution is often cited as the most democratic in Bangladesh's history, given later amendments which undermined the constitution's democratic credentials, including the separation of powers, the independence of the judiciary and the freedom of MPs to vote and debate in parliament. However, the constitution left wide powers for judicial review and judicial precedent, making Bangladesh a part of the common law world.

The first blows to the original constitution came in 1973 and 1974, when Prime Minister Sheikh Mujibur Rahman's government passed amendments that gave the state the power to suspend fundamental rights during a state of emergency. In 1975, Sheikh Mujibur Rahman enacted a presidential government under a one party state. Following his assassination, quasi-military rulers continued the presidential form of government, but restored multiparty politics. An executive presidency lasted till 1990, when parliamentary democracy was restored; and the presidency returned to its ceremonial nature.

As a result of the controversial Article 70, Bangladesh has never seen a no-confidence motion to remove a prime minister, even though the country's prime ministers are often accused of dictatorship and incompetence. The lack of checks and balances is often criticized.

The dominance of left-wing parties led by the Awami League in the constituent assembly resulted in numerous references to socialism in the document. The socialist influence contradicts with Bangladesh's largely free market economy.

The citizenship debate of "Bengali v Bangladeshi" contributed to a sense of alienation among the indigenous hill population in the country's southeast, and was seen as a factor behind the Chittagong Hill Tracts conflict, which lasted for two decades until 1997.

The unitary state laid down by the constitution has been a stumbling block for decentralizing Bangladesh's judiciary. When the government created High Courts in cities like Sylhet, Rajshahi and Chittagong in 1988, the Supreme Court ruled that it was in contradiction of the unitary state.

See also
Constituent Assembly of India
Constituent Assembly of Pakistan
Legislatures of British India
Bengal Legislative Assembly
Bengal Legislative Council
Legislative Council of Eastern Bengal and Assam

References

Bangladesh
Bangladesh Liberation War
Constitution of Bangladesh